Hopewell Culture National Historical Park is a United States national historical park with earthworks and burial mounds from the Hopewell culture, indigenous peoples who flourished from about 200 BC to AD 500.  The park is composed of six separate sites in Ross County, Ohio, including the former Mound City Group National Monument. The park includes archaeological resources of the Hopewell culture.  It is administered by the United States Department of the Interior's National Park Service.

In 2008, the Department of the Interior included Hopewell Culture National Historical Park as part of the Hopewell Ceremonial Earthworks, one of 14 sites on its tentative list from which the United States makes nominations for the UNESCO World Heritage Sites.

Location 
Hopewell Culture National Historical Park consists of six geographically separated units:

1. Mound City Group is the site of the visitor center and the only fully restored Hopewell site. 

Location: Mound City Group 
16062 State Route 104
Chillicothe, OH 45601
 This site in Union Township in Ross County.

2. Seip Earthworks
Location:
7078 US Route 50
Bainbridge, OH 45612

3. Spruce Hill Earthworks
Location:
By permit only. Contact the visitor center for information.

4. Hopewell Mound Group
Location:
4731 Sulphur Lick Rd.
Chillicothe, OH 45601
 This site in Union Township in Ross County.

5. Hopeton Earthworks
Location:
990 Hopeton Rd.
Chillicothe, OH 45601
 
6. High Bank Works
Location:
Not open to the public as of 8/5/2020

History

Hopewell culture

From about 200 BC to AD 500, the Ohio River Valley was a central area of the prehistoric Hopewell culture. The term Hopewell (taken from the land owner who owned the land where one of the mound complexes was located) culture is applied to a broad network of beliefs and practices among different Native American peoples who inhabited a large portion of eastern North America.  The culture is characterized by its construction of enclosures made of earthen walls, often built in geometric patterns, and mounds of various shapes.  Visible remnants of Hopewell culture are concentrated in the Scioto River valley near present-day Chillicothe, Ohio.

The most striking Hopewell sites contain earthworks in the form of squares, circles, and other geometric shapes. The people who built them had a detailed knowledge of the local soils, and they combined different types to provide the most stability to the works. It required the organized labor of thousands of man hours, as people carried the earth in handwoven baskets.

Each mound within the group covered the remains of a charnel house. After the Hopewell people cremated the dead, they burned the charnel house. They constructed a mound over the remains. They also placed artifacts, such as copper figures, mica, projectile points, shells, and pipes in the mounds.

Discovery and protection
European Americans first mapped the site in the 1840s. The archaeologists Ephraim George Squier and Edwin Hamilton Davis were the first excavators of the site and amassed a large collection of Mound artifacts that is now preserved at the British Museum. Much of it was destroyed during World War I when the United States Army constructed a military training base, Camp Sherman, on the site.  After the war, they razed the camp.  The Ohio Historical Society conducted an archaeological excavation of the site from 1920–1922, followed by reconstruction of the mounds.  In 1923, the Department of Interior declared the Mound City Group a National Monument, to be administered by the Federal government.

In 1992, Mound City Group was renamed and expanded as Hopewell Culture National Historical Park. Its definition included remnants of four other nearby earthwork and mound systems. Two Ross County sites are within a few miles of Mound City and open to the public. Hopewell Mound Group is the site of the 1891 excavation on the land of Mordecai Hopewell (for whom the culture is named). Hopeton Earthworks located across the Scioto River from Mound City and High Bank Works, which is closed to the public.

The Ohio Historical Society also maintains a number of mound systems and elaborate earthworks in the southern Ohio area, including the National Historic Landmarks of Fort Ancient, Newark Earthworks, and Serpent Mound.  Fifteen mound complexes earlier identified in the county have been lost to agriculture or urban development.

The national park contains nationally significant archaeological resources, including large earthwork and mound complexes.  These provide insight into the sophisticated and complex social, ceremonial, political, and economic life of the Hopewell people.

The park visitor center features museum exhibits with artifacts excavated from the Mound City Group, an orientation film, book sales area, and self-guided and guided tours.

See also
 List of Hopewell sites

References

Further reading
 Squier, Ephraim G. and Davis, Edwin H., Ancient Monuments of the Mississippi Valley, Washington D.C.: Smithsonian Institution Press, 1998. (reprint of 1848 book)
 Woodward, Susan L. and McDonald, Jerry N., Indian Mounds of the Middle Ohio Valley, Blacksburg, VA: McDonald & Woodward Publishing, 1986.

External links
 Hopewell Culture National Historical Park
 Mound City, Ancient Ohio Trail
 Hopewell Ceremonial Earthworks UNESCO World Heritage Nomination
 Ancient Monuments of the Mississippi Valley which features Hopewell Culture National Historical Park, as Mound City

Archaeological type sites
Ohio Hopewell
National Historical Parks of the United States
State parks of Ohio
Protected areas of Ross County, Ohio
National Register of Historic Places in Ross County, Ohio
Protected areas of Ohio
Museums in Ross County, Ohio
Archaeological sites on the National Register of Historic Places in Ohio
Archaeological museums in Ohio
Native American museums in Ohio
National Park Service areas in Ohio
Protected areas established in 1923
Mounds in Ohio
1923 establishments in Ohio
Parks on the National Register of Historic Places in Ohio